Szczecin Dąbie is a railway station in the city of Szczecin, West Pomeranian, Poland. The train services are operated by PKP and Przewozy Regionalne.

Train services

Public transport
Bus services 64 and 77 depart from outside the station.

References

External links

PKP website 
Przewozy Regionalne website 

Dąbie